Pedro Rivas (24 November 1945 – 23 June 2007) was a Panamanian basketball player who competed in the 1968 Summer Olympics. He was born in Colón, Panama.

References

1945 births
2007 deaths
Sportspeople from Colón, Panama
Panamanian men's basketball players
1970 FIBA World Championship players
Olympic basketball players of Panama
Basketball players at the 1968 Summer Olympics
Basketball players at the 1967 Pan American Games
Pan American Games bronze medalists for Panama
Pan American Games medalists in basketball
Medalists at the 1967 Pan American Games